I'm Easy is a 1976 album by Keith Carradine recorded at Devonshire Sound Studios, North Hollywood, and Elektra Sound Recorders, Los Angeles. The album, named after the hit single "I'm Easy", reached number 61 on the US Billboard 200.

Track listing
All tracks composed by Keith Carradine
"Honey Won't You Let Me Be Your Friend"
"High Sierra"
"Been Gone So Long"
"I'm Easy"
"The Soul is Strong"
"I Will Never Forget Your Face"
"It's Been So Long"
"Raining in the City"
"I'll Be There"
"Spellbound"

Personnel
Keith Carradine - vocals, guitar, backing vocals
Ben Benay, Dean Parks, Larry Carlton, Lee Ritenour - guitar
Max Bennett, Reinie Press - bass
Dave Grusin - Fender Rhodes, synthesizer, arrangements; ARP synthesizer on "I'm Easy"
Earl Palmer, Harvey Mason, Jim Gordon - drums
John Guerin - drums; piano on "I'm Easy"
David Luell - saxophone
Al Aarons - trumpet
Mike Barone - trombone
Carol Carmichael, Ted Neeley - backing vocals
John Mayall - piano and harmonica on "Been Gone So Long"
Frank Rosolino - trombone on "The Soul is Strong"
Dennis Budimir - guitar on "I Will Never Forget Your Face"
Technical
Fritz Richmond, Jerry Hudgins - engineer
Henry Lewy, John Guerin, Jerry Hudgins - mixing
Glen Christensen - art direction
George Hurrell - photography

References

1976 debut albums
Asylum Records albums